A timeline of China's media-related history since World War II, including computer hardware, software development, the history of the Internet, etc.

Prior to founding of the People's Republic of China 
Mao Zedong stated that the masses should be involved in journalism. In his widely publicized remarks with journalists at Jin-Sui Daily in 1948, Mao said, "With our newspapers, too, we must rely on everybody, on the masses of the people, on the whole Party to run them, not merely on a few persons behind closed doors."

1950s
In both the Yan'an era of the 1930s and the early 1950s, the Chinese Communist Party (CCP) encouraged grassroots journalism in the form of "worker-peasant correspondents," an idea originating from the Soviet Union.

In 1956, the “Long-Range Plan for the Development of Science and Technology from 1956-1967” commissioned a group of scientists and researchers to develop computer technology for national defense. The Plan's goals included furthering radio, telecommunication, and atomic energy projects. Shortly thereafter, the first state-sanctioned computer development program began with the Chinese Academy of Sciences affiliated Beijing Institute of Computing Technology (ICT).

In 1958, the first Chinese-made computer was developed by the Institute of Military Engineering at the University of Harbin as part of the ICT. The computer, dubbed the 901, was a vacuum-tube computer. The 901   was a copy of an earlier Soviet model.

1960s
After the Chinese stopped receiving Soviet technical and financial assistance in 1960, there was a deeply felt loss of technical expertise that stunted development. Additionally, the Cultural Revolution slowed technological progress. However, transistor-based  computers including the 109B, 109C, DJS-21,  DJS-5 and C-2 were developed during the 1960s. Despite the large improvements in the computing power of these machines, and advances in the hardware like integrated-circuitry there is little evidence that computers were being designed for widespread consumer use.

During this period of Chinese "self-reliance," the computers developed in the second half of the 1960s did not resemble Soviet computers nor their Western counterparts. The new transistor-based machines were distinctly Chinese creations.

During the early period (1966-1968) of the Cultural Revolution, freedom of the press in China was at its peak. While the number of newspapers declined in this period, the number of independent publications by mass political organizations grew. Mao used mass media to encourage rebels to establish their own independent mass political organizations and their own publications. According to China's National Bureau of Statistics, the number of newspapers dropped from 343 in 1965, to 49 in 1966, and then to a 20th-century low of 43 in 1967. At the same time, the number of publications by mass organizations such as Red Guards grew to an estimated number as high as 10,000. Independent political groups could publish broadsheets and handbills, as well as leaders' speeches and meeting transcripts which would normally have been considered highly classified. Several Red Guard organizations also operated independent printing presses to publish newspapers, articles, speeches, and big-character posters. For example, the largest student organization in Shanghai, the Red Revolutionaries, established a newspaper that had a print run of 800,000 copies by the end of 1966. Government controls on restricted literature also collapsed during the Cultural Revolution.

Rusticated youths with an interest in broadcast technology frequently operated the rural radio stations after 1968.

1970s
The Cultural Revolution continued to severely stagnate technological development in the first half of the 1970s.

Loudspeakers (mostly wired) remained the dominant aspect of the Chinese audio technology until 1976. Despite transistorization of radios in the 1960s, private radios continued to lag behind loudspeakers due to the comparatively high cost of transistor radios a well as concerns about private radio listening to "enemy" shortwave broadcasts.

Until the 1976 invention of the Cangjie input method, computing technologies lacked an efficient way of inputting Chinese characters into computers. The Cangjie method uses Chinese character radicals to construct characters.

In 1977, the first microcomputer, the DJS-050 was developed.

In 1978, China's aggressive plan for technological development was announced at the Chinese National Conference on Science and Technology. Further developing microcomputers, integrated circuits, and national databases were all declared priorities.

1980s
In 1980, the Chinese computing technology was estimated to be about 15 years behind United States technology. From the early 1980s on, China's leaders recognized that their nationalistic development strategy was inhibiting their scientific competitiveness with the West. Therefore, imports from the United States and Japanese companies such as IBM, DEC, Unisys, Fujitsu, Hitachi, and NEC greatly increased.  However, high tariffs discouraged the direct import of computers, instead encouraging foreign corporations to provide hardware and software to domestic enterprises.

In 1980, the GB 2312 Code of Chinese Graphic Character Set for Information Interchange-Primary Set was created allowing for 99% of contemporary characters to be easily expressed.

In 1982, the Shanghai Bureau of Education chose 8 elementary students and 8 middle-school students from each district, and gave them very basic computer training. This is the first experiment using a computer in Chinese children's education.

In 1983, the first Chinese supercomputer,"Galaxy," was developed.

In 1984, the New Technology Developer Inc. (the predecessor of the Legend Group and now known as Lenovo) was funded by the Chinese Academy of Sciences.

In 1985, the Great Wall 0520CH, was the first personal computer that used Chinese character generation and display technology, therefore capable of processing information in Chinese. The Great Wall models commanded a substantial share of the domestic computer market for the next decade.

The 1986, Seventh Development Plan marked a turning point in China's commercial computer industry, as the electronics industry was designated as a "pillar" that would help drive the entire Chinese economy.

In 1987, Professor Qian Tianbai sent the first email from China, signifying China's first use of the Internet. The email message was "Across the Great Wall we can reach every corner in the world."

1990s
In 1990, Professor Qian Prof. Werner Zorn registered the country code top level domain .CN.

In 1994, the National Computing & Networking Facilities of China project opened a 64K dedicated circuit to the Internet, Since then, China has been officially recognized as a country with full functional Internet accessibility.

In 1996, CHINANET is completed and operational. Nationwide internet services are available to the general public.  China's first Internet café soon followed.

The 1996 Ninth Five Year National Development Plan emphasized the development of technical infrastructure and expanding the personal computer industry.

In 1999, the National Research Center for Intelligent Computing Systems announced that it developed a super server system capable of conducting 20 billion floating-point operations per second, making China one of the few nations in the world that have developed high-performance servers.

By the end of 1999, there were approximately 20 million PCs in operation in China.

2020s

In 2020, China was the world's largest jailor of journalists with at least 118 detained.

References

Mass media in China
Supercomputing in China
Chine, media history of